Phan Huy Quát (Hà Tĩnh Province, 12 June 1908 – 27 April 1979) was a South Vietnamese doctor and politician who served as Prime Minister of the Republic of Vietnam for four months in 1965.

Early life
Phan Huy Quát was born in Lộc Hà District in Hà Tĩnh Province. He attended the Lycée Pellerin, Huế, then studied medicine in Hanoi and qualified as a doctor before entering politics.

On 1 July 1949, Quát was appointed Minister of Education by Head of State Bảo Đại. On 22 January 1950, Prime Minister Nguyễn Phan Long appointed Quát Minister of Defense, at which position he had only served briefly before the Cabinet was re-organized and he returned to working for the Đại Việt Quốc dân đảng.

In June 1953, Prime Minister Nguyễn Văn Tâm appointed Quát Minister of Defense. Quát would be in this position until 1954 when Prince Bửu Lộc became Prime Minister who appointed Quát Special Minister in charge of the democratization process for Vietnam. Dr. Quát then served briefly as an interim Prime Minister until Bảo Đại appointed Ngô Đình Diệm to the position.

In April 1960, Quát signed the Caravelle Manifesto, a list of grievances and demands specifically critical of Diệm, and was promptly jailed by the GVN. After Diệm's assassination in October 1963, Quát was appointed Foreign Minister by Major General Nguyễn Khánh, one of the principal participants in the bloody coup. Though Quát frequently criticized Khánh's self-serving rule, he remained in Khánh's cabinet until November 1964, when Trần Văn Hương was installed as Prime Minister of General Khánh's freshly created High National Council (HNC).

On 16 February 1965, the Armed Forces Council, a group of South Vietnamese military officers who took over when General Khánh deposed Hương and the HNC, secured Quát's appointment to Prime Minister in order to foil a power grab by the junta chief Khánh, who intended to install the economist Nguyễn Xuân Oánh as his puppet in the Prime Minister post. Khánh himself was forced to step down after a coup on 19/20 February and was subsequently exiled. Air Marshal Nguyễn Cao Kỳ then led the junta that oversaw the civilian cabinet. 

In 1965, Kỳ was appointed Prime Minister and Nguyễn Văn Thiệu became President by a special joint meeting of military leaders following the voluntary resignation of civilian President Sửu. After leaving the Prime Minister post, Dr. Quát returned to his medical practice. He remained in politics until 1975 by working with the Asia Anti-Communist League (Liên Minh Á Châu Chống Cộng) as Chairman of its Vietnamese office.

Last years/death
After the Fall of Saigon, Quát went into hiding. In August 1975, he was arrested and jailed at Chí Hòa Prison after a failed attempt to escape from Vietnam. It was there that he died of liver failure on 27 April 1979. The official report indicated that Quát had died from "a stroke, heart attack and liver failure".

See also
1965 South Vietnamese coup

References

Further reading

External links

Vietnamese people of the Vietnam War
South Vietnamese politicians
Prime Ministers of South Vietnam
1908 births
1979 deaths
People from Quảng Bình province
Deaths from liver failure
Vietnamese people who died in prison custody
Prisoners who died in Vietnamese detention
Government ministers of Vietnam
Nationalist Party of Greater Vietnam politicians
Place of birth missing